The Pawnee River or Pawnee Fork is a river in western Kansas in the United States, about  long. It is a tributary of the Arkansas River, which in turn is a branch of the Mississippi River.

For  the river runs due north, before turning northeast near Ravanna. The river arcs to the south and receives Buckner Creek, its main tributary at the town of Burdett, then flows east past Rozel and through Fort Larned National Historic Site. It joins the Arkansas River on the left bank, south of the city of Larned.

Most of its flow is consumed by irrigation before it reaches the mouth, and the river dries up for periods of months at a time in most years. The land surrounding the river was originally inhabited by the Kansa, Cheyenne, Osage, Pawnee and other tribes, the latter for which the river is named. The river was a route for the Santa Fe Trail in the 19th century, and was also the scene of Native American-U.S. wars in 1854, after which Fort Larned was established on the river to maintain a permanent military presence in the region.

See also
List of rivers of Kansas

References

Rivers of Kansas
Tributaries of the Arkansas River
Bodies of water of Gray County, Kansas
Bodies of water of Pawnee County, Kansas